Robert William Hugh O'Neill, 1st Baron Rathcavan,  (8 June 1883 – 28 November 1982), known as Sir Hugh O'Neill, 1st Baronet, from 1929 to 1953, was an Ulster Unionist member of both the Parliament of the United Kingdom and the Parliament of Northern Ireland.

Background and education
O'Neill was the third son of Edward O'Neill, 2nd Baron O'Neill, and the uncle of Terence O'Neill, Prime Minister of Northern Ireland. Educated at Eton College and New College, Oxford, Hugh O'Neill was subsequently called to the Bar at Inner Temple. He served as a Major in the British Army.

Political career
Although O'Neill contested the constituency of Stockport in 1906, he was first elected to the Westminster Parliament for Mid-Antrim in 1915, he later represented Antrim and then North Antrim.

O'Neill was also elected to represent Antrim in the Northern Ireland House of Commons in 1921 and served as its first Speaker, before standing down from his seat in 1929. On 17 June 1929 he was created a Baronet, of Cleggan in the County of Antrim. In 1934, he was appointed High Sheriff of Antrim.

From 1933 to 1939, O'Neill was the Chairman of the 1922 Committee. He sat on the Privy Council of Ireland, and was the sole surviving member of that body immediately prior to his death in 1982. He was also a member of its northern relation, the Privy Council of Northern Ireland and the Privy Council of the United Kingdom. From 1939 to 1940, he was the Parliamentary Under-Secretary of State for India and Burma, and was the Lord Lieutenant of Antrim from 1949 to 1959.

O'Neill retired from the Westminster Parliament in 1952, having become the Father of the House the previous year, and was raised to the peerage as Baron Rathcavan, of The Braid in the County of Antrim, on 11 February 1953.

Personal life
Lord Rathcavan died in 1982 at the age of 99 and was succeeded by his eldest surviving son, Phelim.

See also
 List of Northern Ireland Members of the House of Lords

References

Northern Ireland Parliamentary Elections Results: Biographies

External links 
 Cleggan Lodge
 
 

1883 births
1982 deaths
Alumni of New College, Oxford
British Army personnel of World War I
British Yeomanry officers
Chairmen of the 1922 Committee
Royal Ulster Rifles officers
High Sheriffs of Antrim
Younger sons of barons
Lord-Lieutenants of Antrim
Oneill, Hugh
Oneill, Hugh
Oneill, Hugh
Oneill, Hugh
Members of the Privy Council of Ireland
Members of the Privy Council of Northern Ireland
Members of the Privy Council of the United Kingdom
Oneill, Hugh
Oneill, Hugh
Oneill, Hugh
Oneill, Hugh
Oneill, Hugh
Oneill, Hugh
Oneill, Hugh
Oneill, Hugh
Oneill, Hugh
Oneill, Hugh
Oneill, Hugh
Oneill, Hugh
Oneill, Hugh
UK MPs who were granted peerages
Imperial Yeomanry officers
Oneill, Hugh
Oneill, Hugh
Oneill, Hugh
Oneill, Hugh
Members of the House of Commons of Northern Ireland for County Antrim constituencies
Ulster Unionist Party hereditary peers
Hereditary barons created by Elizabeth II
Ministers in the Chamberlain wartime government, 1939–1940
People educated at Eton College